The 2012–13 Bangalore Super Division was the tenth season of the Bangalore Super Division which is the third tier of the Indian football system and the top tier of the Karnataka football system.

At the end of the season it was HAL Sports Club who finished as the champions.

Teams

Table

Fixtures and Results

References

Bangalore Super Division seasons
3